Jeffrey W. Harrison (b. Cincinnati, Ohio) is an American poet. Born in Cincinnati, he was educated at Columbia University, where he studied with Kenneth Koch and David Shapiro. His most recent poetry collection is Into Daylight (Tupelo Press 2014), which follows The Names of Things: New & Selected Poems (The Waywiser Press, 2006). His poems have appeared in literary journals and magazines, including The New Republic, The New Yorker, The Paris Review, Poetry, The Yale Review, Poets of the New Century. His honors include Pushcart Prizes, Guggenheim, National Endowment for the Arts, and Amy Lowell Traveling fellowships. He has taught at George Washington University, Phillips Academy, and College of the Holy Cross. He is currently on the faculty of the Stonecoast MFA Program at the University of Southern Maine.  He lives in Dover, Massachusetts.

Published works
Full-Length Poetry Collections

Honors and awards
 The Singing Underneath selected by James Merrill for the National Poetry Series,
 1999 Guggenheim Fellowship
 1995 Ingram Merrill Foundation Fellowship
 National Endowment for the Arts
 two Pushcart Prizes
 1988-1989 Amy Lowell Poetry Travelling Scholarship
 Lavan Younger Poets Award from the Academy of American Poets.
 Reflection on the Vietnam War Memorial

References

External links
 Author's website
 
 
 
 
 Ploughshares > Authors > Jeffrey Harrison

Year of birth missing (living people)
Living people
George Washington University faculty
College of the Holy Cross people
College of the Holy Cross faculty
University of Southern Maine faculty
American male poets
Poets from Ohio
Poets from Massachusetts
National Endowment for the Arts Fellows
The New Yorker people
Writers from Cincinnati
People from Dover, Massachusetts
Columbia College (New York) alumni